Edward Cline (born October 22, 1946 in Pittsburgh, Pennsylvania) is an American novelist, essayist and an air force veteran. He is best known for his Sparrowhawk series of novels, which are set in England and Virginia before the American Revolutionary War. His other fiction includes a suspense series (featuring American entrepreneur Merritt Fury), a contemporary detective series (featuring Chess Hanrahan, who solves paradoxical murders), and a period detective series (featuring Cyrus Skeen in 1920s San Francisco).

Outside of his work as a novelist, Cline is known for his writings on aesthetics, his defenses of capitalism and of free speech, and his criticisms of contemporary political trends and of Islam (and religion in general). Cline has written on freedom of speech and censorship issues for The Encyclopedia of Library and Information Science and The Journal of Information Ethics. He has written feature and cover stories, as well as book reviews, for Marine Corps League Magazine, The Colonial Williamsburg Journal, The Wall Street Journal, and The Intellectual Activist. His article on English political philosopher John Locke was carried in two editions of Western Civilization (McGraw-Hill). He has written the Rule of Reason blog for the Center for the Advancement of Capitalism since 2003. He has written a "counter-jihad handbook" about Islam. His columns have also appeared on Capitalism Magazine, Family Security Matters, and other blog sites. As a writer, his strongest influence has been novelist-philosopher Ayn Rand.

In May 2016, Cline was informed by the FBI that his name was on a list of over 8,000 names that was characterized as an ISIS kill list. Cline's landlord promptly evicted him. In an interview with Vocativ Cline said, "The situation is unprecedented in my lifetime experience. I've never before been evicted or thrown under the bus for what I think and write."

Bibliography 
 First Prize, Mysterious Press/Warner Book, 1988, 
 Whisper the Guns, Atlantean Press, 1992, 
 Whisper the Guns, Patrick Henry Press, 2011, 
 Sparrowhawk One: Jack Frake, MacAdam/Cage Publishing, 2001, 
 Sparrowhawk Two: Hugh Kenrick MacAdam/Cage Publishing, 2002 
 Sparrowhawk Three: Caxton, MacAdam/Cage Publishing, 2004, 
 Sparrowhawk Four: Empire, MacAdam/Cage Publishing, 2004, 
 Sparrowhawk Five: Revolution, MacAdam/Cage, 2005, 
 Sparrowhawk Six: War, MacAdam/Cage, 16 January 2007, 
 Sparrowhawk Companion, MacAdam/Cage, 2008,  (in collaboration with Jena Trammell, editor)
 Sparrowhawk: Book One, Jack Frake, Patrick Henry Press, July 2013, 
 Sparrowhawk: Book Two, Hugh Kenrick, Patrick Henry Press, August 2013,
 Sparrowhawk: Book Three, Caxton, Patrick Henry Press, August 2013, 
 Sparrowhawk: Book Four, Empire, Patrick Henry Press, August 2013, 
 Sparrowhawk: Book Five, Revolution, Patrick Henry Press, August 2013, 
 Sparrowhawk: Book Six, War, Patrick Henry Press, August 2013, 
 The New Sparrowhawk Companion, Patrick Henry Press, December 2013, 
 Presence of Mind, Perfect Crime Books, 2010, 
 Honors Due, Perfect Crime Books, 2011, 
 First Prize, Perfect Crime Books, 2010, 
 With Distinction, Perfect Crime Books, 2012, 
 Run From Judgment, Patrick Henry Press, 2012, 
 We Three Kings, Patrick Henry Press, 2012, 
 China Basin, Patrick Henry Press, 2012, 
 The Head of Athena, Patrick Henry Press, 2012, 
 The Daedâlus Conspiracy, Patrick Henry Press, 2012, 
 The Chameleon, Patrick Henry Press, 2012, 
 A Crimson Overture, Patrick Henry Press, 2013, 
 The Black Stone, Patrick Henry Press, 2014, 
 Running Out My Guns, Patrick Henry Press, 2012, 
 Broadsides in the War of Ideas, Patrick Henry Press, 2012, 
 Corsairs and Freebooters, Patrick Henry Press, 2012, 
 Boarding Parties & Grappling Hooks, Patrick Henry Press, 2013, 
 Letters of Marque, Patrick Henry Press, 2013, 
 From The Crow's Nest, Patrick Henry Press, 2014, 
 The Pickwick Affair, Patrick Henry Press, 2014, 
 Islam's Reign of Terror, Patrick Henry Press/Voltaire Press, 2014, 
 Rational Scrutiny: Paradoxes and Contradictions in Detective Fiction, Patrick Henry Press, 2014, 
 Handbook on Islam: A Counter-Jihad Guide for the Uninitiated, the Ill-Advised the Misinformed, and the Lied-To, ‎CreateSpace Independent Publishing Platform, 2015, 
 Silver Screens, Patrick Henry Press, 2015, 
 The Circles of Odin, Patrick Henry Press, 2015, 
 Sleight of Hand, Patrick Henry Press, 2015, 
 Stolen Words, Patrick Henry Press, 2015, 
 An August Interlude, Patrick Henry Press, 2015, 
 Cogitations: Recent Reflections on the State of Things, Patrick Henry Press, 2015 
 Wintery Discontent, Patrick Henry Press, 2015 
 Manhattan Blues, Patrick Henry Press, 2016 
 The Janus Affair, Patrick Henry Press, 2016 
 First Things, Patrick Henry Press, 2016 
 Civic Affairs, Patrick Henry Press, 2016 
 Exegesis, Patrick Henry Press, 2016 
 Seeing Double, Patrick Henry Press, 2016 
 Trichotomy, Patrick Henry Press, 2016 
 Routing Islam, Patrick Henry Press, 2016 
 Beginnings, Patrick Henry Press, 2016 
 Reciprocity, Patrick Henry Press, 2016 
 Saving Athena, Patrick Henry Press, 2017 
 Split Infinitives, Patrick Henry Press, 2017 
 Passions, Patrick Henry Press, 2017 
 Celebrity News, Patrick Henry Press, 2017 
 Inquest, Patrick Henry Press, 2017 
 Double Entendre, Patrick Henry Press, 2017 
 Sufferance, Patrick Henry Press, 2017 
 The Skeen Chronicles, Patrick Henry Press, 2017 
 Reprisals, Patrick Henry Press, 2017 
 The Pendulum, Patrick Henry Press, 2017 
 School Days, Patrick Henry Press, 2018 
 The Gumshoe Guild, Patrick Henry Press 2018 
 Serenity Patrick Henry Press 2018 
 Chicago Serenade Patrick Henry Press 2018 
 Collectables Patrick Henry Press 2018 
 Flute Patrick Henry Press 2018 
 A Final Canvas Patrick Henry Press 2019 
 Gallery Patrick Henry Press 2019 
 The Ghouls of Grammatical Egalitarianism Patrick Henry Press 

 References 

 External links 
 
 Edward Cline's articles at Capitalism Magazine
 "Interview with novelist, Ed Cline, author of Sparrowhawk Series", Egoist'', 2008 11 21

1946 births
Living people
American essayists
American historical novelists
Objectivists
American atheists
Novelists from Virginia
People from York County, Virginia
Writers from Pittsburgh
American male novelists
American male essayists
Novelists from Pennsylvania
Anti-Arabism in North America
Anti-Pakistan sentiment
American critics of Islam
Counter-jihad activists